Advenus montisilvestris, the mountain forest galliwasp, is a species of lizard of the Diploglossidae family. It is the only member of the genus Advenus,  as well as the only species of the subfamily Celestinae that is found outside of the Caribbean.

Taxonomy
It was formerly classified in the genus Diploglossus.

Distribution and habitat
It is endemic to eastern Panama, where it is found in the montane forests of the Serranía de Pirre mountain range.

References

Diploglossidae
Reptiles of Panama
Endemic fauna of Panama
Monotypic lizard genera